Praze may refer to:
 Praze-An-Beeble, a village in Cornwall, United Kingdom
 St Erth Praze, a hamlet in Cornwall, United Kingdom
 Prague, the capital of the Czech Republic